The 120th New York Infantry Regiment was an infantry regiment in the Union Army during the American Civil War.

Service
The 120th New York Infantry was organized at Kingston, New York, and mustered in for three years service on August 22, 1862, under the command of Colonel George Henry Sharpe.

The regiment was attached to the following brigades:

 Whipple's Brigade, Defenses of Washington, D.C., to October 1862
 1st Brigade, 2nd Division, III Corps, Army of the Potomac, to December 1862
 2nd Brigade, 2nd Division, III Corps, to March 1864
 2nd Brigade, 4th Division, II Corps, Army of the Potomac, to May 1864
 4th Brigade, 3rd Division, II Corps, to July 1864
 3rd Brigade, 3rd Division, II Corps, to June 1865.

The 120th New York Infantry mustered out of service June 3, 1865. Veterans and recruits whose enlistments had not expired were transferred to the 73rd New York Infantry.

Detailed service

1862 

 Left New York for Washington, D.C., August 24, 1862.
 Duty in the defenses of Washington, D. C., until November 1862.
 At Fairfax Station, Virginia, until November 25.
 Operations on the Orange & Alexandria Railroad November 10–12.
 Rappahannock Campaign December 1862 to June 1863. 
 Battle of Fredericksburg, December 12–15, 1862.
 At Falmouth, Virginia, until April 1863.

1863

1864

1865

Casualties
The regiment lost a total of 384 men during service: 11 officers and 140 enlisted men killed or mortally wounded, 3 officers and 179 enlisted men died of disease, and 51 died in Confederate prisons.

Commanders
 Colonel George Henry Sharpe - commanded until assigned to Army of the Potomac Provost Office and Bureau of Military Information on February 9, 1863
 Lieutenant Colonel Cornelius D. Westbrook - took command on February 9, 1863 when Col. Sharpe was reassigned; Westbrook was wounded in action at the Battle of Gettysburg on July 2, 1863
 Major John R. Tappen - took command on July 2, 1863 when Lt. Col. Westbrook was wounded; Tappen was promoted to Lt. Col. on February 27, 1864 and mustered out on December 3, 1864
Major Abram L. Lockwood - took command on December 3, 1864 when Lt. Col. Tappen mustered out; Lockwood was promoted to Lt. Col. on December 20, 1864

See also

 List of New York Civil War regiments
 New York in the Civil War

References

Attribution

Further reading
 Dyer, Frederick H. A Compendium of the War of the Rebellion (Des Moines, IA:  Dyer Pub. Co.), 1908.
 Fiftieth Anniversary of the Muster Into Service of the One Hundred and Twentieth Regiment, N.Y.V. in the War for the Union Celebrated at Kingston, New York, August 22nd, 1912 (Kingston, NY: Freeman Pub. Co.), 1912.
 Santvoord, C. Van. The One Hundred and Twentieth Regiment New York State Volunteers: A Narrative of Its Services in the War for the Union (Roundout, NY: Press of the Kingston Freeman), 1894. [reprinted in 1983]
 Sharpe, George H. & Theodore B. Gates. Addresses Delivered at Music Hall, Kingston, at the Seventh Annual Meeting of the 120th Regimental Union (Kingston, NY: Daily Freeman Steam Print. House), 1875.
 Wilber, Eseck G. May God in His Mercy Spare Our Lives: The Civil War Letters and Diary of Eseck G. Wilber, Co. K, 120th NYV (Cairo, NY: Cairo Historical Society), 2013.

External links
 120th New York Infantry monument at Gettysburg

Military units and formations established in 1862
Military units and formations disestablished in 1865
Infantry 120
1862 establishments in New York (state)